In number theory, the  valuation or -adic order of an integer  is the exponent of the highest power of the prime number  that divides .
It is denoted .

The -adic valuation is a valuation and gives rise to an analogue of the usual absolute value.
Whereas the completion of the rational numbers with respect to the usual absolute value results in the real numbers  , the completion of the rational numbers with respect to the -adic absolute value results in the  numbers .

Definition and properties
Let  be a prime number.

Integers
The -adic valuation of an integer  is defined to be

In particular,  is a function .

For example, and  since .

The notation  is sometimes used to mean .

If  is a positive integer, then

;

Rational numbers
The -adic valuation can be extended to the rational numbers as the function

defined by

For example,  and  since .

Some properties are:
 

Moreover, if , then

where  is the minimum (i.e. the smaller of the two).

-adic absolute value

defined by

Thereby,  for all  and 
for example,  and 

The -adic absolute value satisfies the following properties.

{| class="wikitable"
|-
|Non-negativity || 
|-
|Positive-definiteness || 
|-
|Multiplicativity || 
|-
|Non-Archimedean || 
|}
The subadditivity  follows from the non-Archimedean triangle inequality .

The choice of base  in the exponentiation  makes no difference for most of the properties, but supports the product formula:

where the product is taken over all primes  and the usual absolute value, denoted . This follows from simply taking the prime factorization: each prime power factor  contributes its reciprocal to its -adic absolute value, and then the usual Archimedean absolute value cancels all of them.

The -adic absolute value is sometimes referred to as the "-adic norm", although it is not actually a norm because it does not satisfy the requirement of homogeneity.

A metric space can be formed on the set  with a (non-Archimedean, translation-invariant) metric

defined by

See also
-adic number
Archimedean property
Multiplicity (mathematics)
Ostrowski's theorem
Legendre's formula

References

Algebraic number theory
p-adic numbers